The 3000 and 5000 meters distances for women in the 2012–13 ISU Speed Skating World Cup were contested over six races on six occasions, out of a total of nine World Cup occasions for the season, with the first occasion taking place in Heerenveen, Netherlands, on 16–18 November 2012, and the final occasion also taking place in Heerenveen on 8–10 March 2013.

Martina Sáblíková of the Czech Republic successfully defended her title from the previous season, while Claudia Pechstein of Germany came second, and Diane Valkenburg the Netherlands came third.

Top three

Race medallists

Standings 
''Standings as of 10 March 2013 (end of the season).

References

Women 3000
ISU